The Yasam is the Israel Police Special Patrol Unit ( Yeḥidat Siyur Meyuḥedet), a riot police unit dedicated to continuous security, riot and crowd control, and other special operations.

The Yasam were heavily involved in the Israeli disengagement of August 2005 and Amona evacuation, and have been under widespread criticism for these and other operations.

Officers are often recruited from IDF and Border Police special forces, having all served in combat units of one kind or another. 

Yasam officers wear grey trousers and jackets with a black cap embossed with their unit's insignia.

In Jerusalem Yasam officers are often seen patrolling Jaffa Street (the city's main thoroughfare) on motorbikes which acts as a deterrent against terrorist attacks. They are, however, more often than not involved in breaking up late-night fights outside bars. They have also guarded the Women of the Wall from protestors at the Kotel, and performed counter-riot duties against Palestinians in East Jerusalem.

Weapons and equipment

Motorcycle
 BMW F800GS

Weapons
 Glock pistol
 M4 Carbine

See also
 Yamam

External links
Yasam at the Israel Police website 
Israeli mayors criticize Yasam 

Police units of Israel